"I'll Go On Loving You" is a song written by Kieran Kane, and recorded by American country music artist Alan Jackson.  It was released in July 1998 as the lead-off single his album High Mileage.  It peaked at number 3 in the United States, and number 2 in Canada. Jackson also recorded a dual-language English/Portuguese version with música sertaneja artist Leonardo of Leandro e Leonardo in 1999.

Content
The song is a mid-tempo ballad in the key of C minor with alternating chord patterns of Cm-A and Cm-B. Through the spoken-word verses, Jackson promises that he will be faithful to his lover, "long after the pleasures of the flesh". The song is accompanied mainly by steel-string acoustic guitar and a string section.

Music video
The music video was directed by Steven Goldmann. Filmed in sepia tone, it shows Jackson and a string band performing the song during a water ballet performance. Jackson disappears in the end.

Critical reception
Alanna Nash of Entertainment Weekly said that the song was "the frankest treatment of lust on country radio", "a colossal embarrassment" and "a memorable romantic declaration."

Chart performance
"I'll Go On Loving You" debuted at number 35 on the Billboard country singles charts in late 1998, representing Jackson's highest chart debut at the time.

Year-end charts

References

1998 singles
1998 songs
Alan Jackson songs
Music videos directed by Steven Goldmann
Song recordings produced by Keith Stegall
Songs written by Kieran Kane
Arista Nashville singles